Together Again is the second collaborative studio album by English singers Michael Ball and Alfie Boe. It was released on 27 October 2017 through Decca Records. The album went to numer one on the UK Albums Chart. As of September 2022, the album had sold 433,362 copies in the UK.

Background
Following the commercial success of Together, which sold over 600,000 copies in the UK, Decca Records announced a "three-way" recording contract with Michael Ball and Alfie Boe in June 2017. Ball and Boe will return to the label as both solo artists and as a duo.

Track listing

Charts

Weekly charts

Year-end albums

Certifications

Release history

References

2017 albums
Albums produced by Nick Patrick (record producer)
Alfie Boe albums
Decca Records albums
Michael Ball albums
Vocal duet albums